Kim Jung-a (born 1 November 1979) is a South Korean field hockey player. She competed in the women's tournament at the 2004 Summer Olympics, where the South Korean Team placed third in their group, missing out of the semi-finals.

References

External links
 

1979 births
Living people
South Korean female field hockey players
Olympic field hockey players of South Korea
Field hockey players at the 2004 Summer Olympics
Place of birth missing (living people)